Sten Kremers (born 16 February 2004) is a Dutch goalkeeper who plays for Jong Ajax.

Early life
From Lichtenvoorde, Kremers played with local amateur side Longa'30 and was in the youth academy at de Graafschap before joining up with the Ajax academy.

Career
In July 2021 Kremers signed his first professional contract with Ajax tying him to the club until 2024. Kremers made his professional debut in the  Eerste Divisie for Jong Ajax against SC Telstar on 8 August 2022.

International career
In September 2022 Kremers was called up for the Dutch U19 team for matches against Slovenia, Northern Ireland and Moldova.

References

2004 births
Living people
Eerste Divisie players
Dutch footballers
Jong Ajax players
Association football goalkeepers